John Bowe may refer to:

 John Bowe (actor) (born 1950), English television actor
 John Bowe (author) (born 1964), American journalist
 John Bowe (footballer) (1911–1990), Australian rules footballer
 John Bowe (racing driver) (born 1954), Australian racing driver
 John Bowe (financier) (born c. 1970), Irish banker
 John Bowe (MP), Member of Parliament (MP) for Taunton

See also
John Bowes (disambiguation)